Alexios Angelos Philanthropenos was a Byzantine Greek nobleman who ruled Thessaly from 1373 until c. 1390 (from c. 1382 as a Byzantine vassal) with the title of Caesar.

Biography
The Angeloi of Thessaly rose to prominence during the reign of the Simeon Uroš ruler of Epirus and Thessaly (r. 1359–1370), as they were related to his wife. When Simeon died in 1370, he was succeeded by his son John Uroš (r. 1370–1373). John cared more for religious pursuits than the governance of the state, and entrusted the affairs of state to Alexios, who held the high Byzantine title of Caesar. Eventually, probably in 1372/73, John retired from public life altogether and entered a monastery, leaving Alexios as the ruler of Thessaly.

Alexios was married to Maria Angelina Radoslava (born late 1356 or after, if she is the daughter of Irene Asanina), a daughter of the Serbian general Radoslav Hlapen, and was supported by the powerful local magnates. Around 1382, Alexios sought the protection of the Byzantine Empire, recognizing the suzerainty of the prince Manuel Palaiologos, who at the time governed Thessalonica as an appanage. Alexios is lastly recorded in 1388, and must have died by c. 1390, when he was succeeded by his son (or perhaps brother), Manuel. It is recorded that in 1389, the "Caesar of Thessaly" sent aid to the ruler of Ioannina, Esau de' Buondelmonti against the Albanian tribes of Epirus, and that their joint forces scored a major victory over them, but it is unclear if by that date Alexios was still alive.

Either he or, more plausibly, Manuel, was the grandfather of the mid-15th century Serbian ruler Mihailo Anđelović and the Ottoman Grand Vizier Mahmud Pasha Angelović.

References

Sources
 
 
 

1380s deaths
14th-century Byzantine people
Caesars (Byzantine nobles)
Medieval rulers of Thessaly
Alexios
Alexios
Year of birth unknown